Cephalodiscus calciformis is a sessile hemichordate belonging to the order Cephalodiscida. It is the only pterobranch species with funnel-shaped tubaria.

References

calciformis